People’s Poet of Azerbaijan (Azerbaijani: Xalq şairi) is the honorary title granted to the prominent poets of Azerbaijan for their contribution to the development of Azerbaijani literature.

Assignment 
The honorary title "People's Poet of Azerbaijan" was established by Decree of the President of the Republic of Azerbaijan dated May 22, 1998, along with some other titles.

The President of Azerbaijan confers the honorary title on his initiative, as well as on the proposal of the National Assembly and the Cabinet of Ministers.

The title is awarded only to citizens of Azerbaijan. According to the decree, the honorary title of "People's Poet of Azerbaijan" cannot be awarded to the same person repeatedly.

A person awarded an honorary title may be deprived of the title in the cases of misconduct.

Persons awarded the honorary title "People's Poet of Azerbaijan" also receive a certificate and a badge of the honorary title of the Republic of Azerbaijan. The badge of honor is worn on the right side of the chest.

People's Poets of Azerbaijan 

 Bakhtiyar Vahabzadeh
 Zelimkhan Yagub
 Nariman Hasanzadeh
 Sohrab Tahiri
 Mamed Araz
 Khalil Rza Uluturk
 Akim of Billuri
 Fikrat Goja
 Vagif Samedoglu
 Jabir Novruz
 Samad Vurgun
 Sabir Rustamkhanli
 Gabil Imamverdiyev

See also 
People’s Writer of Azerbaijan

References 

Honorary titles of Azerbaijan
Awards established in 1998
1998 establishments in Azerbaijan